Mekhliganj is a city and a municipality in Cooch Behar district in the Indian state of West Bengal. It is the headquarters of the Mekhliganj subdivision.

Geography

Location
It adjoins the boundary of Teesta River. Also it is situated very near to Saniajan River

According to the District Census Handbook 2011, Koch Bihar, Mekliganj covered an area of 3.88 km2.

Area overview
The map alongside shows the western part of the district. In Mekhliganj subdivision 9.91% of the population lives in the urban areas and 90.09% lives in the rural areas. In Mathabhanga subdivision 3.67% of the population, the lowest in the district, lives in the urban areas and 96.35% lives in the rural areas. The entire district forms the flat alluvial flood plains of mighty rivers.

Note: The map alongside presents some of the notable locations in the subdivisions. All places marked in the map are linked in the larger full screen map.

Demographics
As per 2011 Census of India Mekliganj had a total population of 9,217 of which 4,664 (51%) were males and 4,463 (49%) were females. Population in the age range 0–6 years was 1,098. The total number of literate persons in Mekliganj was 6,009 (74.84% of the population over 6 years).

 India census, Mekliganj had a population of 10,833. Males constitute 52% of the population and females 48%. Mekliganj has an average literacy rate of 61%, higher than the national average of 59.5%: male literacy is 68%, and female literacy is 53%. In Mekliganj, 14% of the population is under 6 years of age.

Civic administration

Police station
Mekhliganj police station has jurisdiction over Mekhligaganj municipal area and a part of Mekhliganj CD block.

Education
Founded in 1996, Mekliganj College is an undergraduate college situated at Mekhliganj.  It has total ten academic departments .

Healthcare
Mekhliganj Subdivional Hospital, with 120 beds, functions at Mekhliganj.

References

Cities and towns in Cooch Behar district
Cities in West Bengal